BUKU Music + Art Project is a New Orleans based two-day music and arts festival founded in 2012 by Winter Circle Productions and held annually at Mardi Gras World. BUKU considers itself to be a boutique event that delivers a big festival punch without compromising its house-party vibe.  BUKU seeks to serve as a platform for the intersection of pop culture and the New Orleans underground arts community, and combines international musicians with local food vendors, local visual artists, and various surprise pop-up street performers throughout the site.  BUKU's musical tastes have been a relatively even mix of electronic dance music, hip hop music, and indie rock featuring past performances by Bassnectar, Lana Del Rey, Kid Cudi, Migos, MGMT, Travis Scott, A$AP Rocky, Illenium, Nas, Excision, Major Lazer, Alt-J, TV on the Radio, A Day to Remember, REZZ, Flosstradamus, deadmau5, Kendrick Lamar, Porter Robinson, Pretty Lights, RL Grime, Seth Troxler, Future, Ellie Goulding and dozens of others.

Location and Stages

The festival is held on the New Orleans riverfront at Mardi Gras World, within walking distance of the Warehouse District and the famed French Quarter.  BUKU's unique stages include the Power Plant (outside along the New Orleans Public Belt Railroad with the spooky Market Street Power Plant as the backdrop), the Ballroom (a concert hall with wrap around balcony viewing), the Back Alley (tucked away with the feel of a secret riverside dance party), which was replaced by the Wharf Stage in 2018, and the Float Den (one of the leading Mardi Gras float production houses). Being on the Mississippi River allows BUKU fans incredible views of the Crescent City Connection bridge while boats and barges roll along the river. The Creole Queen riverboat (2012-2017) docked next to the festival, acting as the VIP-only S.S. BUKU for the weekend, with an open bar, special performances and a viewing area of the main stage from the boat's top deck.

In 2018, the festival doubled the size of its site space outside Mardi Gras World and increased its capacity to another 3,000 people each day, totaling 35,000 across its two-day event. This site expansion allowed BUKU to move the Power Plant Stage across the train tracks for even more space, including the new TOO BUKU Rooftop providing VIP ticket holders a perfect view of the main stage. The Wharf Stage, which replaced the Back Alley Stage, is located next to the Mississippi River where the Power Plant Stage used to be. Another big change was the departure of the river boat and the addition of the new VIP Stage, located at the VIP grove near the main stage.

In 2020, BUKU announced more changes to the site and an increased capacity of 25,000 people per day. The 2020 stages include the Port (renamed main stage), The Stacks (located directly in front of the Market Street Power Plant), a new space for the Float Den, Ballroom and The Wharf.

Artwork

In addition to the musical performances, BUKU features installations by prevalent local and national artists. Sculptures, paintings, graffiti, and other mediums are all included, including the annual live graffiti gallery, the pieces of which are created in real time during the festival's two days and auctioned off to fans to raise money for charity. Past live graffiti gallery artists include Hugo Gyrl, Ceaux, DVOTE, Fat Kids, READ, KNOWLA, MEEK, Monica Kelly, Swan, Uter and more.

Other notable art pieces featured at BUKU include the Live Graffiti Gallery, Fort BUKU, L-System Tree, Water Tower, The Beacon and more. Art installations at BUKU are typically fabricated from recycled industrial materials such as IBC totes, pipes and shipping containers.

Furthermore, BUKU curates a program of surprise pop-up performers and revelers ranging from break dancers, bounce dancers, circus troupe performers, flow artists, mobile DJ carts and more.

BUKU also focuses on an all illustrated branding approach conceptualized by Los Angeles-based music and art enigma Young & Sick, who also made his debut festival performance on the Float Den stage at BUKU in 2014. In 2019, the festival rebranded under the direction of electronic music producer and designer Paper Diamond.

Charity
In 2013, BUKU announced its charitable partner Upbeat Academy, an after-school music education program for New Orleans middle- and high school students with a focus on hiphop and dance music production and performance. Upbeat is free to attend for all student-artists and is a registered 501(c)(3) non-profit organization. Every year, a portion of every ticket sold to BUKU Music + Art Project benefits the program. Additionally, student artists and Upbeat Alumni also perform at the festival.

Lineup

2012

March 17, 2012
 Avicii
 Wiz Khalifa
 Diplo
 Holy Fuck
 Mord Fustang
 Pictureplane
 Gramatik
 Yelle (DJ)
 Rockie Fresh
 Wolfgang Gartner (Afterparty)

March 18, 2012
 Skrillex
 YelaWolf
 A-Trak
 Big K.R.I.T.
 Big Gigantic
 SBTRKT
 Purity Ring
 Sepalcure
 G-Eazy
 Figure

2013

March 8, 2013
 Kid Cudi
 Primus 3D
 Kendrick Lamar
 Flux Pavilion
 Zedd
 Best Coast
 Sander Van Doorn
 Flying Lotus
 Datsik
 Japandroids
 R3hab
 Totally Enormous Extinct Dinosaurs
 Birdy Nam Nam
 Earl Sweatshirt
 Lettuce
 Aeroplane
 Shlohmo
 St. Lucia
 JMSN
 Poolside

March 9, 2013
 Calvin Harris
 Passion Pit
 STS9
 NERO
 Major Lazer
 Big Gigantic
 Dillon Francis
 Alt-J
 Starfucker
 Trinidad James
 Flosstradamus
 Icona Pop
 RAC
 Action Bronson
 Dragonette
 Daedelus
 Big Freedia
 Hundred Waters
 Ryan Hemsworth

2014

March 21, 2014
 Ellie Goulding
 Kaskade
 Zedd
 Nas
 Zeds Dead
 Bone Thugs-n-Harmony
 Sleigh Bells
 Pusha T
 Chance the Rapper
 Carnage
 Seth Troxler
 Wavves
 Lotus
 Miami Horror
 Dusky
 Conspirator
 Classixx
 Smallpools
 Big Freedia
 Treasure Fingers
 Tourist
 Blood Diamonds
 Kid Kamillion
 Gravity A
 Flight School Preps
 Jesse Slayter
 DXXXY
 Murder Beach

March 22, 2014
 The Flaming Lips
 David Guetta
 Chromeo
 Explosions In The Sky
 Tyler, The Creator
 The Glitch Mob
 Bauuer B2B RL Grime
 Schoolboy Q
 Beats Antique
 Phantogram
 Danny Brown
 Skream
 Griz
 DJ Snake
 Clockwork
 The Pains Of Being Pure At Heart
 Soul Clap
 Dan Deacon
 Thundercat
 Generationals
 Cashmere Cat
 Blue Sky Black Death
 Young & Sick
 Unicorn Fukr
 Big History
 Javier Drada
 Shanook
 Bent Denim
 Mr. Miserable
 Free Will B

2015

March 13, 2015
 A$AP Rocky
 Empire of the Sun
 Die Antwoord
 Flosstradamus
 STS9
 Portugal. The Man
 RL Grime
 Boosie Badazz
 Run The Jewels
 Gramatik
 Jamie Jones
 Zomboy
 Claude VonStroke
 Yung Lean
 Thomas Jack
 Robert Delong
 Mr. Carmack
 Bob Moses
 Big Freedia
 Slow Magic
 Mija
 Pell
 Suicideyear
 Boyfriend
 Musa
 Herb Christopher B2B Ryan Deffes
 ChrisCross

March 14, 2015
 Bassnectar
 Passion Pit
 TV on the Radio
 Porter Robinson (Live)
 G-Eazy
 Odesza
 Borgore
 Lil B
 Hudson Mohawke
 BadBadNotGood & Ghostface Killah
 xxyyxx
 ILoveMakonnen
 Zella Day
 DJ Windows 98 (Win Butler of Arcade Fire)
 Justin Martin B2B Eats Everything
 Raury
 Slander
 In the Valley Below
 Benoit & Sergio
 Goldlink
 The Range
 Hermitude
 Bixel Boys
 Devon Baldwin
 Sweet Crude
 Gravity A (Plays Talking Heads)
 Carneyval
 Hyphee
 Klutch
 SFAM

2016

March 11, 2016
 Kid Cudi
 Chvrches
 Above & Beyond
 Fetty Wap
 Griz
 Crystal Castles
 Deorro
 Rae Sremmurd
 Baauer
 Tchami
 Art Department
 Mystikal B2B Juvenile B2B Fly Boy Keno
 Post Malone
 Mija B2B Anna Lunoe
 Anderson Paak & The Free Nationals
 Jai Wolf
 Tokimonsta
 J.Phlip B2B Kill Frenzy
 Break Science
 Thugfucker
 G Jones
 Oneman B2B My Nu Leng
 DJ Soul Sister
 Donovan Wolfington
 Tristan Dufrene
 KTRL

VIP
 Sweater Beats
 Illenium
 The Funk Hunters
 Vibe Street
 DJ Matt Scott

March 12, 2016
 Pretty Lights (Live Band)
 Future
 Miike Snow
 Nero
 Purity Ring
 Datsik
 A$AP Ferg
 Yellow Claw
 Feed Me
 What So Not
 Cashmere Cat B2B Trippy Turtle
 Earl Sweatshirt
 Børns
 Kehlani
 Sam Feldt
 Claptone
 Lee Foss
 NGHTMRE
 Julio Bashmore
 SNBRN
 Casey Veggies
 Givers
 Le Youth
 CRWNS
 Fro-Yo Ma
 Sunsabetchez

VIP
 Autograf
 Louis The Child
 DRAM
 Prince Fox
 Kidd Love

2017

March 10, 2017
 Travis Scott
 GRiZMATIK
 Zeds Dead
 Young Thug
 Jauz
 Sleigh Bells
 Lil Dicky
 TroyBoi
 Lil Yachty
 Slushii
 Thundercat
 Lido
 Car Seat Headrest
 Clams Casino
 Big Wild
 Shiba San B2B Justin Jay
 San Holo
 Opiou
 K?D
 Sophie
 Nora En Pure
 Kaiydo
 Whethan
 Unicorn Fukr
 Musa B2B Otto
 Roar!
 LLEAUNA

VIP
 Ekali
 Andrew Luce
 Chet Porter
 Nebbra
 Shallou

March 11, 2017
 Deadmau5
 Run The Jewels
 Tycho
 ZHU
 21 Savage
 Vince Staples
 Nina Kraviz
 Washed Out
 Cashmere Cat
 Malaa
 Alina Baraz
 Ghastly B2B Herobust
 The Floozies
 REZZ
 Suicideboys
 Aminé
 Lane 8
 Minnesota B2B Space Jesus
 M.A.N.D.Y.
 Oshi
 Ambré
 Af The Naysayer
 Caddywhompus
 Boogie T.
 SFAM

VIP
 Ganja White Night
 Hosh Pan
 Stélouse
 Pusher
 DJ Soul Sister

2018

March 9, 2018
 Migos
 SZA
 MGMT
 Virtual Self (U.S. Fest Debut)
 A Day to Remember
 Alison Wonderland
 Snails
 Flatbush Zombies
 Ganha White Night B2B Boogie T
 Bonobo (DJ)
 Mura Masa
 Green Velvet
 Bishop Briggs
 Rich the Kid x Famous Dex
 Lil Xan
 Falling in Reverse
 Soulection
 Sango B2B ESTA B2B The Whooligan
 Honey Dijon
 Homeshake
 Spag Heddy
 Clozee
 Walker + Royce
 The Russ Liquid Test
 New Thousand
 Nice Rack B2B Rusty Lazer
 Bouffant Bouffant

VIP (Presented by Space Yacht)
 Eprom B2B Mad Zach
 Droeloe
 BlackGummy
 Squnto
 Tvboo

March 10, 2018
 Bassnectar
 Lil Uzi Vert
 Illenium (Live)
 Isaiah Rashad
 REZZ
 Borgore
 Sylvan Esso
 Little Dragon
 Jay Electronica
 Snakehips
 Gryffin
 Jai Wolf
 Ski Mask the Slump God
 NoName
 Hippie Sabatage
 Smino
 Princess Nokia
 Elohim
 Jade Cicada
 Emo Nite LA
 Nnamdi Ogbonnaya
 Zach Villere
 AF the Nayslayer x Yung Vul
 KTRL B2B Red Barrington
 KiddLove

VIP (Presented by Brownies + Lemonade)
 Graves
 Medasin
 Melvv
 Ducky
 Suicide Year

2019

March 22, 2019
 Lana Del Rey
 Excision
 Kevin Gates
 RL Grime
 Nghtmre B2B Slander (DJs)
 Playboi Carti
 Claude VonStroke
 Fisher (musician)
 Mayday Parade
 Toro y Moi
 Death Grips
 Denzel Curry
 Ekali
 Tokimonsta
 Kero Kero Bonito
 1788-L
 Rico Nasty
 From First To Last (DJ Set) (Matt + Travis)
 Yves Tumor
 Kidswaste
 SunSquabi
 Whipped Cream
 Dounia
 Mason Maynard
 sfam

Reppin' New Orleans
 Bawldy B2B BOARCROK
 Freewater
 The Iceman Special
 Klutch
 Lleauna
 Trax Only
 Trombone Shorty Academy

VIP
 CharlestheFirst
 Dabin
 Noizu
 AF the Naysayer

March 23, 2019
 A$AP Rocky
 Dog Blood
 GRiZ
 Louis the Child (DJs)
 Ella Mai
 Suicideboys
 Dashboard Confessional
 Gunna (rapper)
 The Black Madonna
 Earl Sweatshirt
 J.I.D
 Getter (DJ) (presents Visceral)
 Yaeji
 G Jones
 Liquid Stranger
 Oliver Tree
 Kasbo
 Peekaboo (musician)
 Papadosio
 Earthgang
 Roy Blair
 Doja Cat
 We Came As Romans
 Mersiv

Reppin' New Orleans 
 Dohm Collective
 Freewater
 James Seville
 Lil Jodeci
 Malik Ninety Five
 Thou
 Tristen Dufrene
 Unicorn Fukr
 Upbeat Academy

VIP 
 Duskus
 Jantsen
 Kittens
 Xie

2020
Canceled due to Covid

2021
Canceled due to Covid

See also
List of electronic music festivals

References

External links 
 

Music festivals established in 2012
American music industry
Music festivals in Louisiana
Electronic music festivals in the United States
Festivals in New Orleans